Penthièvre (French: Gare de Penthièvre) is a railway station in Saint-Pierre-Quiberon, Morbihan department of Brittany, France. The station was opened on 23 July 1882, and is located on the Auray–Quiberon railway. The station is served by TER Bretagne services operated by the SNCF, between Auray and Quiberon (summer only).

History 
When the Compagnie du Chemin de fer de Paris à Orléans opened the Aurey-Quiberon railway on 24 July 1882, trains didn't stop at Penthièvre.

In 2018, SNCF estimated the 970 passengers passed through the station.

References

External links
 Auray-Quiberon timetable

TER Bretagne
Railway stations in France opened in 1882
Railway stations in Morbihan